Hamburg Messe is a business unit of Hamburg Messe und Congress GmbH.

The area of Hamburg Messe hosts about 40 trade fairs annually, with over 15000 exhibitors and 700000 visitors.

About 15 events are operated by Hamburg Messe itself.

Exhibition grounds 

The convention center consists of eleven halls with a total space of 87000 m² and another 10000 m² outside of the halls.

"Neue Messe Hamburg" 
The current site is the result of a large expansion undertaken 2004 to 2008. Originally the fair ground was bound to the area between St. Petersburger Straße, Karolinenstraße und Holstenglacis / Bei den Kirchhöfen and consisted of the halls 1 to 12. It was then extended west across Karolinenstraße with another four halls (A1 to A4). The original halls 9 to 12 became B1 to B4 and halls 1 to 8 were replaced with the new halls B5 to B7.

The original hall 8 was 24 meters in height and had complete glass walls, making this hall particularly useful for large exhibits like full hot air balloons. It was also used for some concerts.

Events and exhibitions 
The well known and regular events hosted on the premises of the Hamburg Messe include among others:
 Aircraft Interiors Expo – International convention for aircraft interiors (operated by Reed Exhibitions in co-operation with Hamburg Messe und Congress)
 HansePferd Hamburg – International exhibition for riders and horse owners
 Internorga – International trade show for foodservice and hospitality
 SMM – The leading international maritime trade fair
 MS&D – International conference on maritime security and defence
 Reisen Hamburg  – Expo for travel, caravaning, outdoor and biking
 WindEnergy Hamburg – On- and offshore wind energy expo (in co-operation with Messe Husum & Congress)
 Coteca – International trade show for the coffee, tea and cocoa industries
 Seatrade Europe – Cruise and Rivercruise Convention

References

External links

 Hamburg Messe
 Congress Center Hamburg

Trade fairs in Germany
Hamburg